Elizabeth Claypole (née Cromwell; 2 July 1629 – 6 August 1658) was the second daughter of Oliver Cromwell, Lord Protector of the Commonwealth of England, Scotland and Ireland, and his wife, Elizabeth Cromwell, and reportedly interceded with her father for royalist prisoners. After Cromwell created a peerage for her husband, John Claypole, she was known as Lady Claypole. She was buried in Westminster Abbey.

Biography 
Her marriage to John Claypole took place on 13 January 1646. She was the favourite daughter of her father, to whom her spiritual condition seems to have caused some anxiety. On one occasion he writes to his daughter, Bridget, expressing his satisfaction that her sister (i.e. Claypole) "sees her own vanity and carnal mind, bewailing it, and seeks after what will satisfy". But four years later he bade her mother warn her to "take heed of a departing heart and of being cozened with worldly vanities and worldly company, which I doubt she is too subject to".<ref>Firth, DNB, xi,12 cites Letter clxxi.</ref>

According to several accounts she was too much exalted by her father's sovereignty, for which reason Lucy Hutchinson, a biographer and scholar who married one of the regicides, terms her and all her sisters (excepting Bridget Fleetwood) "insolent fools." Captain Titus writes to Hyde relating a remark of Elizabeth Claypole's at a wedding feast concerning the wives of the major-generals:

But according to the account of Harrington, "she acted the part of a princess very naturally, obliging all persons with her civility, and frequently interceding for the unhappy." It was to her he applied with success for the restoration of the confiscated manuscript of Oceana.Firth, DNB, xi,12,13

According to Ludlow and Heath, she interceded for the life of Dr. John Hewett, but her own letter on the discovery of the plot in which he had been engaged throws a doubt on this story. Still she is said to have habitually interceded with her father for political offenders. Ludlow reported that her failure in this pleading may have contributed to her death, which happened soon after with the concurrence of an ulcer in her womb. "How many of the royalist prisoners got she not freed? How many did not she save from death whom the laws had condemned?"

She was taken ill in June 1658, and her sickness was aggravated by the death of her youngest son, Oliver. The nature of her disease is variously stated: "The truth is," writes Fleetwood, "it's believed the physicians do not understand thoroughly her case". Clarendon, Heath, Bates, and other royalist writers represent her as upbraiding her father in her last moments with the blood he had shed. The first hint of this report occurs in a newsletter of 16 September, where it is said that the Lady Claypole "did on her deathbed beseech his highness to take away the high court of justice".

She died on 6 August 1658, and the Mercurius Politicus in announcing her death describes her as "a lady of an excellent spirit and judgment, and of a most noble disposition, eminent in all princely qualities conjoined with sincere resentments of true religion and piety." She was buried on 10 August in Henry VII's chapel in Westminster Abbey. After the Restoration, Firth states in the Dictionary of National Biography that her body was exhumed, along with about twenty others, and placed into a pit in a graveyard near the back door of the prebendary's lodgings.Howell, p. 678, quotes Neil History of the Puritans. However, Peter Gaunt states in the more recent Oxford Dictionary of National Biography that her body was allowed to remain in the Abbey. Dean Stanley, during his search for the body of James I, found it in situ in 1869.

Of her four children, three sons and a daughter, Cromwell Claypole died in May 1678 unmarried; Henry is reported to have predeceased his brother; Oliver died in June 1658; and Martha died in January 1664. None left any descendants.

 Influences 
She inspired the figure of Delmira, in the Italian tragedy of 1671 Il Cromuele (The Cromwell) written by Girolamo Graziani, set in England during the Civil War.

Ancestry

Notes
Footnotes

Citations

References

C. H. Firth. Dictionary of National Biography Volume XI, pages 12,13. Sources
Noble's House of Cromwell
Carlyle's Letters and Speeches of Cromwell ;
Ludlow's Memoirs, 1751;
Clarendon State Papers ;
Thurloe Papers.
C. H. Firth, Claypole , Elizabeth (bap. 1629, d. 1658), rev. Peter Gaunt, Oxford Dictionary of National Biography, Oxford University Press, 2004 accessed 9 Aug 2009
Thomas Bayly Howell (editor), Thomas Jones Howell, William Cobbett, David Jardine. A complete collection of state trials and proceedings for high treason and other crimes and misdemeanors from the earliest period to the year 1783, with notes and other illustrations,Edition	5, Longman, Hurst, Rees, Orme and Brown, 1816.
Ramsey, R. W. Elizabeth Claypole'', The English Historical Review, Vol. 7, No. 25 (Jan. 1892), pp. 37–47

Attribution

1629 births
1658 deaths
Burials at Westminster Abbey
Elizabeth
17th-century English women
Children of Oliver Cromwell